Yenikarpuzlu (former Müsellim Cedit)  is a town (belde) in the İpsala District, Edirne Province, Turkey. Its population is 2,984 (2022).

Geography

History
The village Müsellim Cedit was founded in 1877 by Pomak people. After the first World War, they didn't allowed the Greek Army to enter city. In the new republic (Turkey) it was renamed Karpuzlu and later Yenikarpuzlu. In 1975 the village was declared a township.

Economy
The town is on a very low altitude plain covered with marsh areas. The main economic activity is irrigated farming and the main crop is rice. Fresh water fishing is a secondary activity.

References

Towns in Turkey
Populated places in İpsala District
Pomak communities in Turkey